The Inbetweeners is a BAFTA Award-winning British sitcom created by Damon Beesley and Iain Morris, set in a fictional secondary school, and broadcast on E4. The series follows the lives of four suburban sixth form student friends – protagonist Will McKenzie (Simon Bird), his best friend Simon Cooper (Joe Thomas), and their friends Jay Cartwright (James Buckley) and Neil Sutherland (Blake Harrison). The series is narrated by Will, who is the programme's central character.

The first series consists of six episodes, starting with the first episode "First Day", which was shown on E4 on 1 May 2008, and ran until 29 May 2008. The second series began on 2 April 2009 with "The Field Trip" and ran for six episodes, also on E4. The third series began on 13 September 2010 with "The Fashion Show" and ended on 18 October 2010 with "The Camping Trip".

Series overview

Episodes

Series 1 (2008)

Series 2 (2009)

Series 3 (2010)

See also
 The Inbetweeners Movie
 The Inbetweeners 2

References

Channel 4-related lists
Lists of British sitcom episodes
Lists of British teen comedy television series episodes
Lists of sex comedy television series episodes
Episodes